Tawfiq Canaan (24 September 1882 – 15 January 1964) was a pioneering Palestinian physician, medical researcher, ethnographer, and Palestinian nationalist. Born in Beit Jala during the rule of the Ottoman Empire, he served as a medical officer in the Ottoman army during World War I. During British rule, he served as the first President of the Palestine Arab Medical Association founded in 1944, and as the director of several Jerusalem area hospitals before, during, and after the 1948 war. Over the course of his medical career, he authored more than thirty-seven studies on topics including tropical medicine, bacteriology, malaria, tuberculosis, and health conditions in Palestine, and contributed to research that led to a cure for leprosy.

Deeply interested in Palestinian folklore, popular beliefs, and superstitions, Canaan collected over 1,400 amulets and talismanic objects held to have healing and protective properties. His published analyses of these objects, and other popular folk traditions and practices, brought him recognition as an ethnographer and anthropologist. The several books and more than 50 articles he wrote in English and German serve as valuable resources to researchers of Palestinian and Middle-Eastern heritage. Canaan also published works in Arabic and was fluent in Hebrew.

An outspoken public figure, he also wrote two books on the Palestine problem, reflecting his involvement in confronting British imperialism and Zionism. He was arrested by the British authorities in 1939. The last two decades of his life were lived in the shadow of several personal tragedies: the loss of his brilliant son in an accident at Jerash, the loss and destruction of his family home, and of his clinic in Jerusalem during the 1948 war.

Canaan managed to re-establish his life and career in East Jerusalem under Jordanian rule. First taking sanctuary in a convent in the Old City for two years, he was appointed director of the Augusta Victoria Hospital on the Mount of Olives, where he lived with his family through his retirement until his death in 1964.

Early life

Born in the village of Beit Jala in Palestine during the rule of the Ottoman Empire, Canaan studied as a child at the Schneller School, founded by German missionaries in nearby Jerusalem. His father Bechara, who was also schooled there, founded the first Lutheran church, YMCA, and co-ed school in Beit Jala and the first Arab pastor for the German Protestant Palestine Mission. His mother, Katharina, was raised in a German orphanage in Beirut and met Bechara while working at a hospital in Jerusalem.

In 1898-9, Canaan went to Beirut to study medicine at the Syrian Protestant College (today the American University of Beirut). Obliged to work while studying as his father died of pneumonia shortly after his arrival, he graduated with distinction in 1905. His valedictory speech, "Modern Treatment", was likely his first published piece and broached the use of serums, animal organs and X-rays.

Canaan attributed his love of, interest in, and dedication to the people, culture and land of Palestine to his upbringing and the influence of his father who regularly took the family with him on his trips around the country. In the Jerusalem Quarterly, Khaled Nashef suggests Canaan's knowledge of nature in Palestine as exhibited in writings such as "Plant-lore in Palestinian Superstition" (1928) among others were informed by these trips.

Medical career

Returning to Jerusalem from Beirut, Canaan began work in the German Deaconesses Hospital [German], co-administering it with Dr. Adalbert Einsler (1848–1919) during a senior physician’s absence in 1906. He was also sought as a manager at the German-Jewish Hospital (Shaare Zedek). His first published medical article as a practicing physician, “Cerebro-Spinal Meningitis in Jerusalem" (1911), was based on studies he conducted with the director there.

Between 1912-1914, Canaan travelled to Germany several times to further his knowledge of microbiology and tropical diseases. He met his wife, Margot Eilender, in an Esperanto class on his first trip there. Margot's father was a German importer and she was born and raised in Palestine. They were quickly married, having their first child Yasma that same year, and built their family home in the al-Musrarah district of Jerusalem in 1913, where their three other children (Theo, Nada, and Leila) were born. In that home, Canaan also opened the only Arab clinic operating in Jerusalem at the time.

One of the physicians Canaan collaborated with in Germany was Hans Müch, head of a mission to Palestine whose 1913 report on tuberculosis included three research papers authored by Canaan. That same year, he was appointed director of the Malaria Branch of the International Health Bureau, a world center for medical research and microscopic examination founded by The German Society for Fighting Malaria, The Jewish Health Bureau, and The Jewish Physicians and Scientists for Improving Health in Palestine. He also served patients at the Arab General Hospital in the hilltop village of Sheikh Badr next to Jerusalem.

World Wars I & II
Canaan was working in the German Hospital in Jerusalem in 1914 when World War I began in October. As a citizen of the Ottoman Empire, which administered Palestine at the time, Canaan was drafted as an officer into the Ottoman army. First assigned as a physician to a contingent in Nazareth, he was transferred that same year to 'Awja al-Hafeer. He was appointed Head of the Laboratories on the Sinai Front by the German chief physician in charge there, a position that allowed Canaan to travel between Bir as-Saba, Beit Hanoun, Gaza, and Shaykh Nouran, as well as Damascus, Amman, and Aleppo. During this period, he collected more than 200 amulets to add to a collection he had begun in the early 20th century. He contracted both cholera and typhus during the war and survived, though his brother Wadia was killed in the fighting and buried at the Zion cemetery in Jerusalem.

Soon after the end of the war, in 1919, Canaan was appointed Director of The Leprosy Hospital (Asylum of the Lepers Jesushilfe, now Hansen House) in Talbiyyah, the only leprosy hospital in Syria, Palestine, and the Transjordan. Considered an incurable disease at the time, Canaan contributed to research in the fields of bacteriology and microscopic examination that resulted in the discovery of a cure using chaulmoogra oil.

With the reopening of the German Hospital in 1923, Canaan was appointed head of the Internal Medicine Division, a position he held until the hospital had to cease operations in 1940. The onset of World War II meant that most German citizens had either left Palestine or been arrested by the British Mandatory authorities as enemy aliens.

Over the course of his medical career, Canaan treated people from all classes and segments of Palestinian and Arab society. He was one of a number of physicians from Jerusalem to examine Sherif Hussein of Mecca in Amman before his death in 1931, and removed a bullet from the thigh of Abu Jildah, a notorious Palestinian rebel, in 1936. An entry on Canaan is included in the book Famous Doctors in Tropical Medicine (1932) by Dr. G. Olpp, director of the tropical medicine center in Tübingen, indicating he was well known & regarded within the medical community.

Research & writings on Palestine
Canaan's interest in Palestinian peasantry (fellaheen) found its first public expression in an Arabic lecture he gave on "Agriculture in Palestine" in 1909. Published in German translation in the geographical journal Globus in 1911, it continues to be recognized as a useful historical reference for basic information on the development of Palestinian agriculture in the early 20th century. In this first article outside the field of medicine, Canaan exhibits his deep familiarity with the field of "Oriental Studies", referencing the work of Schumacher, Bauer, Guthe and Burckhardt, alongside classical sources, like Strabo and Josephus, and Arab sources like Mujir ad-Din. Influenced too by the Old Testament studies of Gustaf Dalman, Albrecht Alt, and Martin Noth, all of whom were personal acquaintances, Canaan used the Bible as a basic source to compare past and present agricultural practices. Canaan and Dalman co-headed The Evangelical German Institute beginning in 1903, and they shared the idea that it is not possible to understand the Old Testament without studying Palestinian folklore.

In "The Calendar of Palestinian Peasants," published by the Journal of the German Palestine Society in 1913, Canaan focused on traditional beliefs organizing the agricultural practices of Palestinian fellaheen. A significant observation recorded in this paper was that people in southern Palestine divided the year into 7 periods of 50 days, a type of pentecontad calendar. Subsequent scholars referencing his work traced the origins of this calendar system to Western Mesopotamia circa the 3rd millennium BCE, suggesting it was also used by the Amorites.

Canaan's first book on Palestinian folklore practices was published in 1914 and entitled Superstition and Popular Medicine.

Palestine Oriental Society & its journal

A member of the American School for Oriental Research (established 1900), the Jerusalem branch of which was headed from 1920 to 1929 by the American archaeologist William Foxwell Albright, Canaan was also a member of the Palestine Oriental Society, (established in 1920 by Albert Tobias Clay). Albright was a lifelong friend of Canaan's, and edited his book 'Mohammedan Saints and Sancruaries (1927), as well as several of his articles, the last in 1962.

Canaan played a very active role in the Palestine Oriental Society, serving as a member of the board, as well as secretary and sometime treasurer from early in the 1920s through until 1948, though the last article he published in its journal was in 1937. Other articles Canaan published for the Journal of the Palestine Oriental Society (1920-1948) – such as, "Haunted Springs and Water Demons in Palestine" (1920–1921), "Tasit ar-Radjfeh" ("Fear Cup"; 1923), and "Plant-lore in Palestinian Superstition" (1928) – exhibit his deep interest in superstition.

Salim Tamari, director of the Institute of Jerusalem Studies, describes Canaan as the most prominent member of a school of "nativist" ethnographers who published their works in The Journal of the Palestine Oriental Society (JPOS). Their research and contributions were motivated by their belief that the "native culture of Palestine" was best represented in the traditions of the fellaheen, and that this ancient "living heritage" had to be urgently documented as the modern world encroached upon the Palestinian countryside. These Palestinian ethnographers included Omar Saleh al-Barghouti, Stephan Hanna Stephan, Elias Haddad, and Khalil Totah, and all of them (excepting Totah) were Jerusalemites, like Canaan.

Mohammedan Saints and Sanctuaries in Palestine
Mohammedan Saints and Sanctuaries in Palestine (1927) is identified by Meron Benvenisti as Canaan's "most outstanding contribution to the ethnography of Arab Palestine and to the annals of his country." In the introduction to the book, Canaan makes explicit his urgent motivation to document ancient, still practiced Palestinian traditions & beliefs threatened by Western influence and the spread of European educational models: "The primitive features of Palestine are disappearing so quickly that before long most of them will be forgotten."

The shrines (awlia), sanctuaries (maqamat) and cults that made up popular Islam and popular religion in Palestine, and local Christian, Jewish and Muslim rituals held in common are outlined in Canaan's work. While local saints worshipped in Palestine can be said to be rooted in Muslim traditions, "they are actually ennobled sheikhs, who after their death, have been elevated to sainthood." Local Muslims, many of whom had never stepped into a mosque, honoured these village saints at awlia, often situated by trees or other natural landmarks, some at or nearby ancient sites of worship for the "local Baals of Canaan" given, as John Wilkinson puts it, a 'Muslim disguise'. Canaan saw these practices as evidence that the fellaheen were heirs to the practices of the earlier pre-monotheistic inhabitants of Palestine, "who built the first high places."

Also covered in this work are therapeutic bathing rituals people undertook to cure diseases and ailments, with descriptions of the specific water sources perceived to be especially holy or effective. Canaan noted how people with fevers, many from malaria, would drink from al-Suhada cistern in Hebron and bathe in springs in Silwan, Kolonia (Ein al-Samiya) and Nebi Ayyub (Ein al-Nebi Ayyub) and a well in Bayt Jibrin for al-Sheikh Ibrahim. Specific swamps were also considered to be sacred healing places. Al-Matbaa at Tel al-Sammam in the Plain of Esdraelon, associated with the wali ("saint") al-Sheik Ibrek, was widely renowned for curing sterility, rheumatism and nervous pains.  Canaan noted that after washing in its water, women seeking to conceive would offer a present to al-Sheikh Ibrek.

Archaeology & ethnography
Among Canaan's acquaintances were a number of specialists in the field of Palestinian archaeology, including William Foxwell Albright, Nelson Glueck, and Kathleen Kenyon, and his interest in the history of the region naturally extended to the field of archaeology. In 1929, he participated in an archaeological expedition in Petra organized by George Horsfield, and discovered at its northern boundary a Kebaran shelter that he named Wadi Madamagh.  That same year he published a five chapter article, "Studies in the Topography and Folklore of Petra", in the JPOS that included topographical maps with Arabic names for the features and sites that he collected from the local Bedouin population, along with oral histories associated with them. He also devoted a chapter to an ethnographic study of the Lijatne tribe, and politely dispelled their erroneous identification as "Simeonites or other Beni-Israel" by non-Arabic speaking authors, due to their sidelocks, noting it just happened to be a recent fashion among them at the time.

Nationalist writings 

Canaan's politics and strong sense of nationalism find clear expression in two of his published works: The Palestine Arab Cause (1936) and Conflict in the Land of Peace (1936).

Published in English, Arabic, and French, The Palestine Arab Cause was a 48-page booklet that collated a series of articles Canaan authored for the local and foreign press following the outbreak of the 1936 Arab revolt. Canaan described British policy in Palestine as, "a destructive campaign against the Arabs with the ultimate aim of exterminating them from their country."  He questioned the nationality laws enacted by the Mandatory authorities which prevented Palestinian immigrants in the Americas, who had been citizens of the Ottoman Empire, from obtaining Palestinian citizenship in Mandate Palestine. Directed at influencing British public opinion, the writings were seen by the Mandatory authorities as subversive.

Conflict in the Land of Peace was penned to respond to an anonymous rebuttal of "The Palestine Arab Cause" that claimed European Jewish immigration to Palestine brought benefits, such as improvements in agriculture and the general health of the peasantry. Canaan delves more deeply into the Palestine problem and deconstructs the alleged benefits. For example, he concedes that Zionist settlers did contribute to controlling the malaria epidemic in Palestine through the draining of swamps, but notes that the workers who performed the actual task were Arabs, who thus transformed lands purchased by Zionist owners at very low prices into more valuable agricultural lands for their exclusive benefit. Recalling that dozens of the Egyptian labourers employed to dig the drainage channels died in the process, Canaan writes: "Baron De Rothschild supplied the money and the Egyptians gave their lives." Canaan further notes that the anonymous pamphleteer ignores that Palestinians and Arabs drained swamps in dozens of sites throughout Palestine, under the supervision of the Department of Health, with Arab financial support and volunteer labour, caring for and improving their own lands and lives.

Canaan was also co-signatory to a document sent to the Higher Arab Committee on 6 August 1936, and there is reason to believe that he supported Arab armed resistance. From 1936 onward, Canaan, clearly expressed his rejection of British policies, in particular the policy of Zionist immigration to Palestine.

Published works
(Partial list)

Folklore and ethnography

 
 
 
  
 
Alternative:  See also Jumana Emil Abboud 
   
   
 
 
Alt:
 
 
 
 
  
 
 
 
 
 
  
  
 
  (translated from German by William Templer)
orig:

Politics 
  (48-page booklet)
  (Published in English, Arabic, and French)

Medical

War & Nakba

Imprisonment of Canaan, his wife, and his sister 
Canaan was arrested by the British Mandate authorities the same day that Britain and France declared war on Germany on 3 September 1939. Ordered released at his second court session, the Criminal Investigation Department intervened and had him imprisoned for nine weeks in Acre. His wife Margot and his sister Badra were also arrested, and imprisoned at a women's facility for criminal prisoners in Bethlehem; Margot for nine months, and Badra for four years. They were then held in Wilhelma, a German colony turned British detention camp for German Palestinians until their release in 1943. Though Margot's arrest was primarily because of her German ancestry, both women were politically active, having helped found the Arab Women's Committee in Jerusalem in 1934. This charitable society took strong political stances, calling for civil disobedience and the continuation of the general strike that kicked off the 1936 revolt. Badra also served as the assistant secretary in the Palestinian delegation to The Eastern Women's Conference that was held in support of Palestine in Cairo in October 1938. These arrests of the Canaan family were part of the general British policy of suppressing  Palestinian resistance to Zionism & British rule.

Arab Medical Society of Palestine 
The Arab Medical Society of Palestine was established in August 1944, based on a decision taken at the Arab Medical Conference in Haifa ten years earlier. A coordinating body for medical associations in cities throughout Palestine, Canaan was its first president. He was also a member of the editorial board for the Society's journal,  ("The Palestinian Arab Medical Journal"), the first issue of which was published in Arabic and English in December 1945. The Society also organized medical conferences, the first of which was in July 1945.

As the situation in Palestinian cities and villages became increasingly insecure, the Society trained and organized relief units and centers to provide medical aid to civilians and the Palestinian and Arab militants fighting to defend them. Contacting and coordinating with the Red Cross to protect hospitals and other humanitarian institutions, the Society also made appeals to medical associations  to send help, and limited medical aid was sent by some in the Arab world. Canaan was also a founding member of the Higher Arab Relief Committee, established on 24 January 1948, to receive aid coming to the country and supervise its distribution.

The Nakba

Bombs and mortar shells hit Arab houses in al-Musrarah quarter of Jerusalem where the Canaan family home was located on 22 February 1948. Shortly thereafter, the children were moved to a safer location, but Tawfiq, Margot, Badra, and Nora (his sister-in-law) stayed, until the house sustained a direct hit on 9 May 1948. The extended family all then went to stay at a convent in the Old City in a room given to them by the  Greek Orthodox Patriarch of Jerusalem, where they lived for two and a half years. Canaan's daughter Leila Mantoura wrote of this time: "Mother and father would go daily to the top of the Wall of Jerusalem to look at their home. They witnessed it being ransacked, together with the wonderful priceless library and manuscripts, which mother guarded jealously and with great pride. They saw mother's Biedermeyer furniture being loaded into trucks and then their home being set on fire." Canaan's family home, library, and three manuscripts ready for publication were destroyed in the process. His collection of amulets and icons was spared, as it had already been entrusted to an international organization in the western part of Jerusalem earlier that same year for safekeeping.

Awards
 Order of the Red Crescent (in World War I)
 Iron Cross of 1914
 Holy Sepulchre Cross with a red ribbon, awarded by the Greek Orthodox Patriarch (1951)
 Order of Merit of the Federal Republic of Germany (1951)

See also 
 Saint George Interfaith shrine
Palestinian Christians

References

Bibliography 

 
 
 
 
 
 
 
 
 
 
 
 
  Originally presented in 1988 as author's thesis (doctoral) at Fachbereich Evangelische Theologie of Philipps-Universität in Marburg

External links
 The Tawfiq Canaan Collection of Palestinian Amulets – A virtual gallery
The Great War in Palestine: Dr Tawfiq Canaan’s Photographic Album, Norbert Schwake, 2014, Jerusalem Quarterly, Institute for Palestine Studies

1882 births
1964 deaths
People from Beit Jala
Arab people in Mandatory Palestine
Ottoman Army personnel
Ottoman military personnel of World War I
Palestinian Lutherans
20th-century Palestinian physicians
Recipients of the Iron Cross (1914)
Commanders Crosses of the Order of Merit of the Federal Republic of Germany
Arabs in Ottoman Palestine
Palestinian Christians
20th-century physicians from the Ottoman Empire
20th-century Lutherans
Palestine ethnographers